Mehedi Hasan, also known as Mehedi Hasan Miraz, is a Bangladeshi cricketer who plays for the Bangladesh national team.

Mehedi Hasan may also refer to:

 Mehedi Hasan (cricketer, born 2002), Bangladeshi cricketer, plays for Brothers Union cricket team
 Mehdi Hasan (cricketer, born 1990), Indian cricketer
 Mehdi Hasan Khan, software developer
 Mehedi Hasan Rana, Bangladeshi cricketer, plays for Comilla Victorians
 Mehedi Hasan Royal, footballer

See also
 Mehdi Hasan (disambiguation)